Block hole may refer to:

 Block hole (cricket), the space between a batter's toes and bat while awaiting a delivery
 An alternative title for the video game Quarth

See also
 Black hole (disambiguation)